Bent Larsen (born July 13, 1954) is a former Danish handball player who competed in the 1976 Summer Olympics.

He played his club handball with Aalborg HK, and was the top goalscorer of the club in the 1978, 1979, 1980 and 1982 Danish Handball League seasons. In 1976 he was part of the Denmark men's national handball team which finished eighth in the Olympic tournament. He played all six matches and scored 32 goals. Former Danish record holder in Javelin throw of 78.32 (1975), five time Danish Champion and bronzemedalist at the European Junior Championship 1973.

External links
Sports-Reference profile
Topscorere siden 1946 - Herrer at Danish Handball Federation

1954 births
Living people
Danish male handball players
Olympic handball players of Denmark
Handball players at the 1976 Summer Olympics